Playing the Field is a BBC television drama series following the lives of the Castlefield Blues, a fictitious female football team from South Yorkshire.

Outline
Inspired by Pete Davies's book I Lost My Heart to the Belles – which was written about a real-life club, the Doncaster Belles – Playing the Field ran for five series, from 1998 to 2002, with scripts by, amongst others, Kay Mellor, Sally Wainwright and Gaynor Faye.

Despite being set in South Yorkshire, much of the location filming took place in Ilkeston, Derbyshire, although the fifth (and final) series was filmed around Leeds; whilst the theme song, "Blue" by Alison Moyet, was originally a B-side track about the singer's love of Southend United FC. A young Marsha Thomason – who has since appeared in U.S. shows Las Vegas and Lost – featured in the first three series of Playing the Field. The first four series have been released on DVD in the UK, but the fifth has yet to be made available.

Main cast

Lorraine Ashbourne ... Geraldine Powell
Melanie Hill ... Rita Dolan
Jo McInnes ... Jo Mullen
Lesley Sharp ... Theresa Mullen
Marsha Thomason ... Sharon 'Shazza' Pearce
Saira Todd ... Gabrielle 'Gabby' Holmes
Debra Stephenson ... Diane Powell
Tracy Whitwell ... Angie Gill
Emma Rydall ... Mikey
Olivia Caffrey ... Kate Howard
Gaynor Faye ... Holly Quinn
Claudie Blakley ... Kelly Powell
James Nesbitt ... James Dolan
Tim Dantay ... Dave Powell
Nicholas Gleaves ... Rick Powell
Ralph Ineson ... Luke Mullen
Chris Walker ... Matthew Mullen
John Thomson ... Eddie Ryan
James Thornton ... Scott
Lee Ross ... Ryan Pratt
James Ellis ... Mr. Mullen
Brigit Forsyth ... Francine Pratt
Elizabeth Spriggs ... Mrs. Mullen
Ricky Tomlinson ... Jim Pratt
Jason O'Mara ... Lee Quinn
Tom Moore ... Martin Dolan
Stephanie Putson ... Heidi

Episodes

Series overview

Series 1 (1998)

Series 2 (1999)

Series 3 (2000)

Series 4 (2000)

Series 5 (2002)

Ratings

Home media
The first four series of Playing the Field have been made available via Universal Playback.

 Playing the Field: Series 1 & 2 (VHS) – 23 October 2000 
 Playing the Field: Series 3 & 4 (VHS) – 23 October 2000
 Playing the Field: Series 1 & 2 (DVD) – 29 January 2007 (released as "Seasons 1 & 2") 
 Playing the Field: Series 3 & 4 (DVD) – 23 April 2007 (released as "Seasons 3 & 4")

Series 5, which was broadcast in 2002 has not received a VHS release, nor has it been released on DVD.

References

External links

1998 British television series debuts
2002 British television series endings
1990s British drama television series
2000s British drama television series
BBC television dramas
Television series by Endemol
Television series by Tiger Aspect Productions
English-language television shows
Television shows set in South Yorkshire